This is the list of the number ones of the Official Subscription Plays Chart during the 2000s. The first song to top the chart was "I Kissed a Girl" by Katy Perry.

Number ones

Notes

References

External links
Digital Plays Top 40 at the Official Charts Company

Subscription Plays
2000s in British music
United Kingdom Subsciption Plays